David Bidney (1908–1987) was an American anthropologist and philosopher associated with the Indiana University.

In 1950 he received a Guggenheim Fellowship in anthropology and cultural studies.

References 

1908 births
1987 deaths
American anthropologists
American philosophers
Indiana University faculty